Erasure is a form of found poetry or found object art created by erasing words from an existing text in prose or verse and framing the result on the page as a poem. The results can be allowed to stand in situ or they can be arranged into lines and/or stanzas.

Writers/artists have adopted this form both to achieve a range of cognitive or symbolic effects and to focus on the social or political meanings of erasure. Erasure is a way to give an existing piece of writing a new set of meanings, questions, or suggestions. It lessens the trace of authorship but also draws attention to the original text.

History 
Doris Cross appears to have been among the earliest to utilize this technique, beginning in 1965 with her "Dictionary Columns" book art.  Other examples before 1980 include:

Radi Os, Ronald Johnson's, long 1977 poem deconstructed from the text of Milton's Paradise Lost. 
A Humument, Tom Phillips' 1970 major work of book art and found poetry deconstructed from a Victorian novel.

The poetic form gained new political purpose online in 2017.

The tradition of concrete poetry and the works of visual artists such as d.a. levy have some relationship to this artform.

Use in representations of political or social themes

Government and military secrecy 

Jenny Holzer's Redaction Paintings consists of enlarged, colorized silkscreen "paintings" of declassified and often heavily censored American military and intelligence documents that have recently been made available to the public through the Freedom of Information Act. The works are intended as reminders of the editing or erasure that goes on behind the scenes in the American military/political power system. Documents address counter-terrorism, prisoner abuse, and the threat of Osama Bin Laden. Some of the documents are almost completely inked out, like Colin Powell's memo on Defense Intelligence Agency reorganization.

Anthropologist Michael Powell writes: "While the literal act of redaction attempts to extract information and eradicate meaning, the black marker actually transforms the way we read these documents, sparking curiosity and often stirring skeptical, critical, and even cynical readings. As redacted government documents make their way from government bureaus into the hands of citizens, a peculiar transformation seems to take place, one that seems to create a paranoia within reason."

Seven Testimonies (redacted) – Nick Flynn's "Seven Testimonies (redacted)" in The Captain Asks a Show of Hands, is an erasure of the testimonies from prisoners at Abu Ghraib.

Holocaust 
Jonathan Safran Foer's 2010 Tree of Codes is a book-length erasure of The Street of Crocodiles by Bruno Schulz.  Schulz was killed by an officer of the Gestapo during the Nazi occupation of his hometown Drohobycz, after distributing the bulk of his life's work to gentile friends immediately prior to the occupation. All of these manuscripts have been lost. The Tree of Codes is Safran-Foer's attempt to represent the unrepresentable loss which occurred in the Holocaust by deleting text, rather than by writing another book about the Holocaust as a historical subject or context for a work of fiction.  Safran-Foer's approach to the Holocaust as an "unrepresentable subject" recalls the use of negative space in the poetry of Dan Pagis.

Freedom and Slavery 
Poet Laureate Tracy K. Smith has written several erasure poems, including "Declaration" (drawn from the Declaration of Independence) and "The Greatest Personal Privation" (from letters about slaveholding).

Indigenous erasure poetry 
Poets such as Jordan Abel and Billy-Ray Belcourt have engaged in erasure poetry to mirror the erasure of Indigenous peoples from history. Through working to erase existing texts such as Treaty 8 in "NDN Coping Mechanisms" by Billy-Ray Belcourt and "Totem Poles" by Canadian ethnographer Marius Barbeau in "The Place of Scraps" by Jordan Abel these two poets "make and unmake texts" the way Indigenous histories have been made and unmade by colonialist influences.

Other examples
Mans Wows – Jesse Glass' Mans Wows (1981), is a series of poems and performance pieces mined from John George Hohman's book of charms and healings Pow Wows, or The Long Lost Friend. 
Nets – Jen Bervin's Nets is an erasure of Shakespeare's sonnets. 
R E D – Chase Berggrun's R E D is a book-length erasure of Bram Stoker's Dracula.
Hope Tree – Frank Montesonti's Hope Tree is a book of erasure poems based on R. Sanford Martin's How to Prune Fruit Trees. 
The O Mission Repo – Travis Macdonald's The O Mission Repo treats each chapter of The 9/11 Commission Report with a different method of poetic erasure.
Erasing Infinite – Jenni B. Baker creates erasure poetry from David Foster Wallace's Infinite Jest, one page at a time.
Of Lamb – Matthea Harvey's Of Lamb is a book-length erasure of a biography of Charles Lamb.
Janet Holmes's The ms of my kin (2009) erased the poems of Emily Dickinson written in 1861–62, the first few years of the Civil War, to discuss the contemporary Iraq War.
A Little White Shadow – Mary Ruefle's A Little White Shadow is a book-length erasure (done by painting over select words of a 19th-century book).
Voyager – Srikanth Reddy's Voyager is another book-length erasure, of Kurt Waldheim's autobiography.
 Poet Yedda Morrison's 2012 book Darkness erases Joseph Conrad's novella, "whiting out" his text so that only images of the natural world remain.
The Place of Scraps (2013) is a book of erasure poetry by Nisga'a writer Jordan Abel.
 ALL KINDS OF FUR (2018) by Margaret Yocom erases her translation of "All Kinds Of Fur", a tale from the Brothers Grimm (a version of Cinderella that opens with incest), to reveal how the heroine, All Kinds Of Fur, would tell her own story.
Be Brave: An Unlikely Manual for Erasing Heartbreak by J. M. Farkas is a book-length erasure of Beowulf.
" Sand Opera"-Philip Metres's book on the War on Terror includes erasures of Abu Ghraib prisoner testimonies, the Standard Operation Procedure manual for the Guantanamo Bay prison, and other sources.
20, – Jennifer Roche's erasure poetry of Jules Verne's 20,000 Leagues Under the Sea published by Alternating Current Press (2020).
[where late the sweet] BIRDS SANG by poet Stephen Ratcliffe is an erasure of Shakespeare's sonnets published by O Books (1989).
''Psaumes - Un sépulcre et toujours un nom, published by Les Gens du blâme Éditions - A Psaumes Book effacement (2018)

See also 
Concrete Poetry
Collection of erasure poems at Poets.org

Notes

Genres of poetry
Poetic devices